This is a list of flag bearers who have represented San Marino at the Olympics.

Flag bearers carry the national flag of their country at the opening ceremony of the Olympic Games.

See also
San Marino at the Olympics

References

San Marino at the Olympics
San Marino
Olympic flagbearers